Antiochus und Stratonica also titled L’amore ammalato, is a 1708 opera by Christoph Graupner for Hamburg's Oper am Gänsemarkt to a mixed German-Italian libretto by ; recitative's are in German and arias are sung in German and Italian, with French-style entrées.

Cast

Demetrius, tenor
Antiochus, baritone
Stratonica, soprano
Seleucus, bass
Negrodorus, tenor
Hesychius / Erasistratus, priest superior / royal physician, baritone
Flavia, soprano
Medor, soprano
Ellenia, soprano
Mirtenia, soprano

Recording
Antiochus und Stratonica, Boston Early Music Festival Orchestra, Capella Ansgarii, Robert Mealy, conductor, CPO 3CD

See also
 Erasistratus Discovering the Cause of Antiochus' Disease

References

External links
 

Compositions by Christoph Graupner
Operas set in Mesopotamia
1708 operas
German-language operas
Italian-language operas
Multiple-language operas
Operas